Rolpa, is a "hill" district in Lumbini Province of Nepal. Rolpa town is the district's administrative center.

The various grievances of Rolpa's population made the district ripe for revolt.  It became a "Maoist Stronghold" of the Communist Party of Nepal.  In May 2002 a major battle between Maoist guerillas and the army was fought at Lisne Lekh near the Rolpa-Pyuthan border.

History
The area of Rolpa District was under the Rukumkot (Rukum District) King before 15th century. Tuthansen (King of Salyankot) established a separate kingdom carving out some 18 villages from Rukumkot Kingdom. The new kingdom was named Gajulkot. These 18 villages were given to Tuthansen in dowry by Jayant Berma who was the king of Rukumkot. These ruins are still available to see in Rolpa District.

Rolpa district was part of two different districts Pyuthan District and Salyan District during Rana regime. In 1962, Rolpa district established carving out parts of Pyuthan District and Salyan District.

Administrative divisions

Rolpa district is divided into 10 local level bodies in which nine are rural municipalities and one is municipality:
Rolpa Municipality
Runtigadhi Rural Municipality
Triveni Rural Municipality
Sunilsmiriti Rural Municipality (previously: Suwarnawati Rural Municipality)
Lungri Rural Municipality
Sunchhahari Rural Municipality
Thabang Rural Municipality
Madi Rural Municipality
Gangadev Rural Municipality (previously: Sukidaha Rural Municipality)
Paribartan Rural Municipality (previously: Duikholi Rural Municipality)

Geography and climate
Rolpa is drained southward by the Madi Khola from a complex of 3,000 to 4,000 meter ridges about 50 kilometers south of the Dhaulagiri Himalaya.  This mountainous barrier historically isolated Rolpa by encouraging travelers between India and Tibet to detour to follow easier routes to the east or west, while east–west travelers found easier routes to the north through Dhorpatan Valley, or to the south through Dang Valley or along the Mahabharat Range.

Demographics
At the time of the 2011 Nepal census, Rolpa District had a population of 224,506. Of these, 86.1% spoke Nepali, 10.8% Magar, 2.6% Kham, 0.3% Gurung and 0.1% other languages as their first language.

In terms of ethnicity/caste, 43.4% were Magar, 33.9% Chhetri, 12.3% Kami, 3.6% Damai/Dholi, 2.3% Sanyasi/Dasnami, 1.1% Hill Brahmin, 0.9% Thakuri, 0.8% Sarki, 0.5% other Dalit, 0.5% Gurung, 0.2% Newar, 0.1% Badi, 0.1% Musalman and 0.2% others.

In terms of religion, 85.2% were Hindu, 11.7% Buddhist, 1.7% Christian, 0.7% Prakriti, 0.1% Muslim and 0.6% others.

In terms of literacy, 59.3% could read and write, 3.2% could only read and 37.5% could neither read nor write.

Population by Census 1971-2021#

Historic, cultural, archeological sites
 Bhama Odar
 Gari Lake, Jaulipokhari
 Bibang Daha, Gam
 Chaturbhuj Panchayan
 Baraha Khetra Badachaur
 Devi and Khadga Temple, Durga Bhawani, Durga Temple
 Gajulkot
 Jaljala, Jankot Jhankristhan
 Kalika Devi, Khungrikot, Kot Maula
 Pateswari Temple
 Shivalaya Mandir
 Kothi Vheer, Gam
 Murelle lake, Holleri

Health services 
Rolpa is one of the most remote district in Nepal in terms of Health services some notable Health care centers being:
Rolpa District Hospital &
Jeevan Anmol Hospital
Jan Namuna Hospital

References

External links
  - Topographic maps of Rolpa District.
 Beautiful place of Rolpa - Jaljala Beautiful Places Of Rolpa

 
Districts of Nepal established in 1962